Lucas Lester Luetge (  born March 24, 1987) is an American professional baseball pitcher for the Atlanta Braves of Major League Baseball (MLB). He previously played in MLB for the Seattle Mariners and the New York Yankees

Career

Early career
Luetge attended Bellville High School in Bellville, Texas, and Rice University, where he played college baseball for the Rice Owls baseball team. 

The Milwaukee Brewers drafted Luetge in the 21st round of the 2008 MLB draft. Luetge spent three and a half seasons with the Brewers minor league affiliates, reaching as high as Double-A with the Huntsville Stars in 2011.

Seattle Mariners
The Seattle Mariners selected Luetge from the Brewers on December 8, 2011 in the Rule 5 Draft.

On April 7, 2012, Luetge made his MLB debut. On June 8, 2012, he was one of 6 pitchers that the Mariners used to no-hit the Dodgers. He recorded one out, getting James Loney on a sacrifice bunt. Luetge was the fourth pitcher to throw in the no-hitter after Kevin Millwood and Stephen Pryor was taken out of the game. In his rookie season, Luetge registered a 3.98 ERA with 38 strikeouts in 40.2 innings of work. The next year, Luetge pitched to a 4.86 ERA in 35 appearances, along with only 27 strikeouts in 37.0 innings pitched, while splitting time between Seattle and the Triple-A Tacoma Rainiers. Luetge spent 2014 up and down between Tacoma and Seattle as well, recording a  5.00 ERA with 7 strikeouts in 9.0 innings pitched for the big league club. On On September 5, 2015, Luetge was outrighted off of the Mariners 40-man roster. At the time, he had only thrown 2.1 innings of scoreless ball on the year, spending the majority of the season in Triple-A. On November 7, 2015, Luetge elected free agency.

Los Angeles Angels
On November 17, 2015, Luetge signed a minor league contract with the Los Angeles Angels organization. On May 22, 2016, Luetge was selected to the Angels' active roster, however he was designated for assignment on May 25 without making an appearance for the big league club. On May 27, he was outrighted to the Triple-A Salt Lake Bees, where he spent the remainder of the season. On October 3, 2016, Luetge elected free agency.

Cincinnati Reds
On November 25, 2016, Luetge signed a minor league contract with the Cincinnati Reds organization. Luetge was assigned to the Triple-A Louisville Bats. On June 1, 2017, the Reds released Luetge.

Baltimore Orioles
On June 4, 2017, Luetge signed a minor league deal with the Baltimore Orioles organization.  He finished the season with the Triple-A Norfolk Tides and elected free agency on November 6, 2017.

Arizona Diamondbacks
On February 4, 2019, Luetge signed a minor league deal with the Arizona Diamondbacks. In 2019 his 55 games pitched tied for the lead in the minor leagues. After splitting the season with the Double-A Jackson Generals and Triple-A Reno Aces, Luetge elected free agency on November 7, 2019.

Oakland Athletics
Luetge signed a minor league contract, with an invite to major league spring training, with the Oakland Athletics on November 25, 2019. Luetge did not play in a game in 2020 due to the cancellation of the 2020 Minor League Baseball season because of the COVID-19 pandemic. He was added to the Athletics' 60-man player pool for the season, but spent the entire year at the alternate site. He became a free agent on November 2, 2020.

New York Yankees

Luetge signed a minor league contract with the New York Yankees for the 2021 season, receiving a non-roster invitation to spring training. After a strong spring training in which he accrued 18 strikeouts in  innings pitched, Luetge was selected to the Yankees' Opening Day roster on March 31. On April 3, 2021, in a game against the Toronto Blue Jays, Luetge appeared in his first major league game since April 25, 2015. He finished the season with a 2.74 ERA in  innings across 57 appearances.

Luetge made the Yankees bullpen for the 2022 season. In 2022 he was 4–4 with a 2.67 ERA. He was designated for assignment on December 21, 2022.

Atlanta Braves
On December 28, 2022, Luetge was traded to the Atlanta Braves in exchange for minor leaguers Chad Durbin and Indigo Diaz.

On January 13, 2023, Luetge signed a one-year, $1.55 million contract with the Braves, avoiding salary arbitration.

Scouting report
Luetge throws a variety of pitches. He has a four-seam and two-seam fastball that average about 90 mph, a sweeping slider in the low 80s, a curveball in the mid-upper 70s, and an occasional changeup. Luetge's wide arm angle on his delivery makes him appealing as a left-handed specialist; through his first 13 appearances in the 2012 season, lefties were hitting only .105 off of him, but righties managed a .308 average.

See also
Rule 5 draft results

References

External links

1987 births
Living people
People from Austin County, Texas
Baseball players from Texas
Major League Baseball pitchers
Seattle Mariners players
New York Yankees players
Rice Owls baseball players
San Jacinto Central Ravens baseball players
Helena Brewers players
West Virginia Power players
Brevard County Manatees players
Huntsville Stars players
Tacoma Rainiers players
Arizona League Mariners players
Surprise Rafters players
Phoenix Desert Dogs players
Salt Lake Bees players
Louisville Bats players
Norfolk Tides players
Jackson Generals (Southern League) players
Reno Aces players